St Ives may refer to:

Places
St Ives, Cornwall
St Ives railway station, in the town
St Ives (UK Parliament constituency), the parliamentary constituency that covers the far west of Cornwall
St Ives, Cambridgeshire, formerly in Huntingdonshire
St Ives (Cambridgeshire) railway station, a former railway station in the town
St Ives, Dorset
Bingley St Ives in West Yorkshire
St Ives, New South Wales, a suburb in Sydney, Australia
St Ives, South Australia, a locality in the Adelaide Hills
St Ives Gold Mine, a gold mine near Kambalda, Western Australia

Saints
Ivo of Kermartin, a Breton lawyer canonized in 1347
Ivo of Chartres
Ia of Cornwall or Ives, patron of the Cornish village
Ivo of Ramsey or Ives, patron of the Cambridgeshire village

Other uses
St. Ives (novel), an 1897 novel by Robert Louis Stevenson
St. Ives (1976 film), a film starring Charles Bronson
St. Ives (1998 film), a film starring Jean-Marc Barr and Miranda Richardson
St. Ives (TV series), a television mini-series broadcast in 1955 

St. Ives Times & Echo, newspaper based in St Ives, Cornwall
St Ives RFC (Cornwall), a rugby union club based in St Ives, Cornwall
St Ives School, a group of artists in St Ives, Cornwall
St Ives School (academy), a secondary school in St Ives, Cornwall
SS St Ives, a ship originally named Empire Mammoth

See also
As I was going to St Ives, a nursery rhyme
St. Ives Compact, a minor Inner Sphere nation in the fictional BattleTech universe
Ives, a surname
St Ive, Cornwall